Bennett Brook may refer to the following rivers: 

 Bennett Brook (Australia)
 Bennett Brook (West Branch Oswegatchie River tributary), in New York 
 Bennett Brook (West Kill tributary),  in New York 
 Bennett Brook (West Branch Tunungwant Creek tributary), in McKean County, Pennsylvania